Mines View Park is an overlook park on the northeastern outskirts of Baguio in the Philippines. It is five kilometers away from the Heart of Baguio, passing through the Botanical Garden, the Mansion House, Wright Park, and the Pacdal Circle.

Located on a land promontory 4 km from downtown Baguio, the park overlooks the mining town of Itogon, particularly the abandoned gold and copper mines of the Benguet Corporation, and offers a glimpse of the Amburayan Valley.

The observation deck is situated below a winding stone-covered stairway close to the parking area.

Gallery

References 

Parks in Baguio
Buildings and structures in Baguio
Tourist attractions in Baguio